The following is the discography of Dutch music producer and DJ Afrojack. His song "Take Over Control", which features Dutch singer Eva Simons, charted in 10 different countries. He released his debut EP Lost & Found on December 22, 2010. In 2011, he was featured on Pitbull's number 1 hit single "Give Me Everything" along with Ne-Yo and Nayer. He also contributed to the single "Run the World (Girls)" by Beyoncé, who initially did not include his credits on the track but was eventually forced to do so after Afrojack filed a case against her. His debut album, Forget the World, was released on 16 May 2014.

Studio albums

Extended plays

Singles

As lead artist

As featured artist

Promotional singles

Other singles
 Jack That Body (2013)
 What We Live For (w/ Bassjackers) (2015)

As DJ Afrojack

As NLW
Daft Ragga (2015)
Yeah (2015)
Disconnect (2015)
Soundboy (with Apster) (2015)
Limit Break (2015)
Party (with MC Ambush) (2016)
Alcohol (with Apster & D-wayne) (2016)
Hands Up (with Dimitri Vegas & Like Mike) (2016)
Home (2016)
Hydra (with Blinders) (2020)

As AJXJS (with Jewelz & Sparks)
The Moment (2018)

As Never Sleeps
You Got The Love (with Chico Rose) (2021)
Stay With You (with DubVision & Manse) (2022)

Guest appearances

Notes

 "Last Night" is also a track to Havana Brown's debut album Flashing Lights.

Remixes
2007
 Greg Cerrone featuring Claudia Kennaugh - "Invincible" (Afrojack Dub Mix)

2008
 Carlos Silva featuring Nelson Freitas and Q-Plus - "Cré Sabe 2008" (Afrojack Remix)
 Steve Angello - "Gypsy" (Afrojack Remix)
 Tom Geiss and Eric G featuring Stephen Pickup - "Get Up" (Afrojack Remix)
 Laidback Luke and Roman Salzger featuring Boogshe - "Generation Noise" (Afrojack Remix)

2009
 Spencer & Hill - "Cool" (Afrojack Remix)
 Kid Cudi featuring Kanye West and Common - "Make Her Say" (Afrojack Remix)
 David Guetta featuring Akon - "Sexy Bitch" (Afrojack Remix)
 Sidney Samson - "Riverside" (Afrojack Remix)
 Silvio Ecomo and Chuckie - "Moombah!" (Afrojack Remix)
 Redroche featuring Laura Kidd - "Give U More" (Afrojack Mix)
 Steve Angello and Laidback Luke featuring Robin S. - "Show Me Love" (Afrojack Short Remix)
 Josh The Funky 1 - "Rock to the Beat" (Afrojack Remix)

2010
 Lady Gaga - "Alejandro" (Afrojack Remix)
 Tocadisco and Nadia Ali - "Better Run" (Afrojack Remix)
 The Black Eyed Peas - "The Time (Dirty Bit)" (Afrojack Remix)
 David Guetta featuring Rihanna - "Who's That Chick?" (Afrojack Remix)
 Benny Benassi - "Satisfaction" (Afrojack Remix)
 Duck Sauce - "Barbra Streisand" (Afrojack Ducky Mix)
 Larry Tee featuring Roxy Cottontail - "Let's Make Nasty" (Afrojack Remix)
 Example - "Kickstarts" (Afrojack Remix)
 i Square - "Hey Sexy Lady" (Afrojack Remix)
 Hitmeister D - "Looking Out for Love" (Afrojack Mix)
 Keane -" Sovereign Light Cafe" (Afrojack Remix)

2011
 David Guetta featuring Flo Rida and Nicki Minaj - "Where Them Girls At" (Afrojack Remix)
 Ian Carey featuring Snoop Dogg and Bobby Anthony - "Last Night" (Afrojack Remix)
 Leona Lewis and Avicii - "Collide" (Afrojack Remix)
 ZZT - "ZZafrika" (Afrojack Rework)
 Lady Gaga - "Marry the Night" (Afrojack Remix)

2012
 Steve Aoki and Angger Dimas featuring Iggy Azalea - "Beat Down" (Afrojack Remix)
 Kirsty - "Hands High" (Afrojack Remix)
 will.i.am featuring Eva Simons - "This Is Love" (Afrojack Remix)
 Michael Jackson - "Bad" (Afrojack Remix)

2013
 Donna Summer - "I Feel Love" (Afrojack Remix)
 Tiësto - "Red Lights" (Afrojack Remix)
 Psy - "Gangnam Style" (Afrojack Remix)
 Miley Cyrus - "Wrecking Ball" (Afrojack Remix)
 Funky Kong - "Anyone Can Dance" (Afrojack vs. DJ Pluto Remix)

2014
 Robin Thicke - "Forever Love" (Afrojack Remix)

2015
 Karim Mika and Daniel Forster - "Crunk" (Afrojack Edit)
 Rihanna, Kanye West and Paul McCartney - "FourFiveSeconds" (Afrojack Remix)
 Mr Probz - "Nothing Really Matters" (Afrojack Remix)
 David Guetta featuring Nicki Minaj, Bebe Rexha and Afrojack - "Hey Mama" (Afrojack Remix)
 Jeremih featuring Flo Rida - "Tonight Belongs to U!" (Afrojack Remix)
 Dimitri Vegas & Like Mike featuring Ne-Yo - "Higher Place" (Afrojack Remix)
 Final Fantasy XV - "Braver" (Afrojack Remix)

2016
 D.O.D - "Taking You Back" (Afrojack Edit)
 KIIDA - "Balangala" (Afrojack Edit)
 Major Lazer featuring Justin Bieber and MØ - "Cold Water" (Afrojack Remix)

2017
 Mercer - "Encore" (DJ Afrojack & SAYMYNAME Remix)
 David Guetta featuring Justin Bieber - "2U" (Afrojack Remix)
 Helene Fischer - "Herzbeben" (Afrojack Remix)

2018
 U2 - "Get Out of Your Own Way" (Afrojack Remix)
 Jewelz & Sparks featuring Pearl Andersson - "All I See Is You" (DJ Afrojack Edit)
 Nicky Romero and Stadiumx featuring Matluck - "Rise" (Afrojack Remix)
 The Chainsmokers featuring Kelsea Ballerini - "This Feeling" (Afrojack and Disto Remix)

2019
 David Guetta featuring Bebe Rexha, and J Balvin - "Say My Name" (Afrojack and Chasner Remix)
 Jewelz & Sparks - "Bring It Back" (Afrojack and Sunnery James & Ryan Marciano Edit)
 Alan Walker featuring Au/Ra and Tomine Harket - "Darkside" (Afrojack and Chasner Remix)

2020
 Georgia Ku - "Ever Really Know" (Afrojack and Chico Rose Remix)

2021
 Noa Kirel - "Please Don't Suck" (Afrojack and Black V Neck Remix)
 Nicky Romero, Marf and Wulf  - "Okay" (Afrojack Remix)
 Mari Cray - "Back To Life" (Afrojack and Chasner Remix)
 Chico Rose and Slvr - "My Sound" (Afrojack Edit)

Production credits
2009
 David Guetta - "Toyfriend" (ft. Wynter Gordon)
 Major Lazer - "Pon De Floor" (ft. Vybz Kartel)

2010
 David Guetta - "Louder Than Words" (with Afrojack ft. Niles Mason)
 Pitbull vs. Afrojack - "Maldito Alcohol"
2011
 Chris Brown - "Look At Me Now" (ft. Busta Rhymes & Lil Wayne)
 Pitbull - "Give Me Everything (Tonight)" (ft. Ne-Yo, Nayer & Afrojack)
 Pitbull - "Something For The DJ's" (with David Guetta & Afrojack)  
 David Guetta - "Titanium" (ft. Sia)
 David Guetta - "Lunar" (with Afrojack)
 David Guetta - "I Just Wanna F" (with Afrojack ft. Dev & Timbaland)
 David Guetta - "The Future" (with Afrojack)
2012
 Pitbull - "Party Ain't Over" (ft. Usher)
 Pitbull - "Have Some Fun" (ft. The Wanted)
 Pitbull - "Last Night (Never Happen)" (ft. Havana Brown)
 Pitbull - "I'm Off That"
 Jay Sean - "So High"
2013
 will.i.am - "Hello"
 INNA - "Be My Lover"
 Paris Hilton - "Good Times" (ft. Lil Wayne)
2014
 Nick Cannon - "Looking For A Dream"
 David Guetta - "Hey Mama" (ft. Bebe Rexha, Nicki Minaj & Afrojack)
2016
 David Guetta - "This One's For You" (ft. Zara Larsson)
 PKCZ - "Mighty Warriors" (with Afrojack, Crazyboy, Anrchy, Sway and Mighty Crown)
2017
 Hiroomi Tosaka - "Diamond Sunset" (with Fais, Kouta Okochi, Afrojack, Oliver Rosa and Fast Lane)
 Dance Earth Party - "To the World" (ft. Afrojack with Dream Shizuka)
2018
 Hiroomi Tosaka - "Luxe" (with Fais, Crazyboy, Yves & Adams, Afrojack and Oliver Rosa)
 Hiroomi Tosaka - "End of Line" (with Kouta Okochi, Fais)
 Hiroomi Tosaka - "Wasted Love" (Fais, Kouta Okochi, Afrojack, Oliver Rosa and Shikata)
 Hiroomi Tosaka - "Hey" (ft. Afrojack; with Fais, Verbal and Yves & Adams)
 Hiroomi Tosaka - "Smile Moon Night" (with Chef Watanabe and Afrojack)
2019
 Sandaime J Soul Brothers from Exile Tribe - "Scarlet" (with Yves & Adams, Giorgio Tuinfort and Afrojack)
 Sandaime J Soul Brothers from Exile Tribe - "Scarlet" (Instrumental) (feat. Afrojack)

Notes

References

Discographies of Dutch artists